HFSC may refer to:

 Hierarchical fair-service curve, a network scheduling algorithm for a network scheduler
 Home Fire Sprinkler Coalition, an organization promoting use of home sprinklers for fire prevention
 United States House Committee on Financial Services, of the United States House of Representatives